Final league standings for the 1992 American Professional Soccer League season.

Regular season

Playoffs

Bracket

Semifinal 1

Semifinal 2

Final

Match statistics

Professional Cup
All five APSL teams took part in the Professional Cup, along with two teams from the Canadian Soccer League and one from the National Professional Soccer League. Just as they would in the APSL Final a week later, Colorado defeated Tampa Bay. This combination, along with winning the 1992 APSL regular season, gave the Foxes  a treble.

Professional Cup Final

Points leaders

Honors
 MVP: Taifour Diané
 Leading goal scorer: Jean Harbor
 Leading goalkeeper: Mark Dodd
 Rookie of the Year: Taifour Diané
 Coach of the Year: Ricky Hill

All-League Best XI

References

External links
 The Year in American Soccer - 1992
 USA - A-League (American Professional Soccer League) (RSSSF)

	

APSL/A-League seasons
1
1992